A Million to One is a 1937 American drama film directed by Lynn Shores and written by John T. Neville. The film stars Bruce Bennett, Joan Fontaine, Reed Howes, Monte Blue, Kenneth Harlan and Suzanne Kaaren. The film was released on March 3, 1937, by Puritan Pictures.

Bennett is billed as Herman Brix, which was his given name and the one he used as an athlete while competing in football and the 1928 Summer Olympics.

Plot
After his father wins the Olympic decathlon but is disqualified for being judged a paid professional athlete rather than an amateur, Johnny Kent becomes a rising star in the athletic world himself.

William Stevens, the runner-up who received the gold medal after John Kent was stripped of it, has a daughter, Joan, who begins seeing young Johnny socially while he trains. The distraction she causes, combined with a rivalry with Duke Hale in competition both in sports and for the girl, complicates matters as Johnny's quest continues.

Cast
Bruce Bennett as Johnny Kent
Joan Fontaine as Joan Stevens
Reed Howes as Duke Hale
Monte Blue as John Kent, Sr.
Kenneth Harlan as William Stevens
Suzanne Kaaren as Pat Stanley
Joey O'Brien as Johnny Kent, as a young boy
Joy Healy as Joan Stevens, as a young girl
Ben Hall as Joe
Edward Peil, Sr. as Mac
Dick Simmons as Friend

References

External links
 

1937 films
1930s sports drama films
American black-and-white films
American sports drama films
Films about Olympic track and field
1937 drama films
Films directed by Lynn Shores
1930s English-language films
1930s American films